Bunju is an administrative ward in the Kinondoni district of the Dar es Salaam Region of Tanzania. According to the 2002 census, the ward has a total population of 20,868. According to the 2012 census, the ward has a total population of 60,236 that include 29,157 males and 31,079 females.

References

Kinondoni District
Wards of Dar es Salaam Region
l.o.no.341428